WLWL (770 AM) is a radio station broadcasting an urban oldies music format with an emphasis on beach music that is licensed to Rockingham, North Carolina, United States.  While its effective coverage range is the Sandhills area of Central North and South Carolina, its signal reaches as far as Charlotte, 75 miles to the west.  The station is currently owned by Beach Music Broadcasting, Inc.

The station was first licensed March 6, 1970. WLWL uses airchecks from WABC in New York that feature the words "seventy-seven" in jingle form to promote its frequency of 770 kHz.
      
WLWL broadcasts only during daylight hours, to avoid interference with WABC, which has a Class A clear-channel license for the same frequency.

References

External links
77 WLWL Facebook

LWL
1970 establishments in North Carolina
Radio stations established in 1970
LWL
Urban oldies radio stations in the United States